Virginia Albert-Poyotte, OBE, is a Saint Lucian politician and former veteran educator. She is the Minister for the Public Service, Home Affairs, Labour and Gender Affairs. Poyotte, the endorsed Saint Lucia Labour Party candidate was elected at the 2021 Saint Lucian General Election as the representative in the House of Assembly for the constituency of Babonneau.

Post career 
Poyotte taught at the Babonneau and the Laguerre Primary Schools from 1971 to 1988. Poyotte once served as the president of the Saint Lucia Teachers Union and General Secretary to the Caribbean Union of Teachers (CUT) .

References

External links 
 Virginia Albert-Poyotte profile at the Saint Lucia Labour Party's website.

Members of the House of Assembly of Saint Lucia
Saint Lucia Labour Party politicians
Living people
21st-century Saint Lucian women politicians
21st-century Saint Lucian politicians
People from Castries Quarter
Officers of the Order of the British Empire
Women government ministers of Saint Lucia
Government ministers of Saint Lucia
Year of birth missing (living people)